Hemiodoecus is a genus of moss bug. It was first identified from a northwestern Tasmania specimen by William Edward China in 1924, and Hemiodoecus leai became the type species. In 1982, Evans concluded that Hemiodoecus was, of known genera, the earliest evolved Australian genus of the Peloridiidae, based upon morphology and distribution. He further suggested that it gave rise to the genera Hemiowoodwardia and Hackeriella, both of which he had originally classified as Hemiodoecus.

Species

Accepted species
 Hemiodoecus crassus Burckhardt, 2009 Australia
 Hemiodoecus acutus Burckhardt, 2009 Australia
 Hemiodoecus leai China, 1924 Tasmania

Other species named
 Hemiodoecus donnae Woodward, 1956 is a junior synonym of Hemiodoecellus fidefis
 Hemiodoecus fidefis Evans is now Hemiodoecellus fidefis
 Hemiodoecus veitchi Hacker, 1932 is now Hackeriella veitchi
 Hemiodoecus wilsoni Evans, 1936 is now Hemiowoodwardia wilsoni

References
 
 
 
 
 
 
 
 
 

Coleorrhyncha genera
Peloridiidae